Kosmos 29 ( meaning Cosmos 29) or Zenit-2 No.19 was a Soviet, a first generation, low resolution, optical film-return reconnaissance satellite which was launched in 1964.

A Vostok-2 rocket, serial number R15001-01, was used to launch Kosmos 29. The launch took place at 10:19 GMT on 25 April 1964, using Site 31/6 at the Baikonur Cosmodrome. Following its successful arrival in orbit the spacecraft received its Kosmos designation, along with the International Designator 1964-021A and the Satellite Catalog Number 00791.

Kosmos 29 was operated in a low Earth orbit. After eight days in orbit, the satellite was deorbited on 3 May 1964 with its return capsule descending by parachute for recovery by Soviet forces.

References

Spacecraft launched in 1964
Kosmos satellites
Spacecraft which reentered in 1964
Zenit-2 satellites